Berlin is a town in Hartford County, Connecticut, United States. The population was 20,175 at the 2020 census. It was incorporated in 1785.  The geographic center of Connecticut is located in the town.  Berlin is residential and industrial, and is served by the Amtrak station of the same name. Berlin also has two hamlets: Kensington and East Berlin.

Town seal
The greatest boom to Berlin industry resulted from the decision of the Patterson brothers to start their business on West Street (now called Lower Lane). For twenty years until 1760, they kept their work in the family selling their wares from a basket. When demand increased they took apprentices into the shop and engaged peddlers to travel throughout the colonies selling the shiny, useful articles (the seal of the Town of Berlin shows such a "Yankee peddler" in eighteenth-century dress with a basket under his arm, a pack on his back full of tinware).  As others learned the trade, they soon set up shop and hired apprentices.  There were so many that the noise of the whitesmiths and their hammering could be heard in every part of town.

History

The town took parts away from Wethersfield (Now Rocky Hill and Newington), Middletown (Now Cromwell), Wallingford (Now Meriden) and Farmington (Now Southington and New Britain). Berlin was one of the birthplaces of interchangeable parts manufacturing and of the industrial revolution in the United States, in the workshop of Simeon North. The town was formerly known as Kensington.

In 1659, Sergeant Richard Beckley purchased 300 acres from Chief Tarramuggus, built a home for his family and became the first settler in what was to become Berlin. Other families slowly followed, and in 1686, Captain Richard Seymour led a group of families from Farmington to begin the first settlement on Christian Lane.

By 1705, the first ecclesiastical society was recognized and the area renamed the Great Swamp Society. The first meetinghouse and cemetery were established a few years later, and the first school house built in 1717.

1722 brought reorganization to the Society. Parts of the towns of Farmington, Wethersfield and Middletown were added to increase the land area, and the name changed to Kensington. In 1772, the Society was divided into an eastern half, called Worthington, and the western section, which retained the name of Kensington. 1785 brought incorporation of the town, which was then called Berlin. New Britain remained a part of Berlin until 1850.

Around 1740, Edward and William Pattison, two brothers from Ireland, emigrated to Berlin and set up the first tinware business in the colonies. Wares in baskets were pedaled from house to house, then, as surplus accumulated, by mule and wagon, traveling all over America and to Canada. This was the birth of "The Yankee Peddler".

During the years from 1700 to 1750, farms, mills, and blacksmiths sprang up through the Great Swamp. Most residents of this area were skilled in one or more of these trades, which were recognized and allowed by the British government. A blacksmith was crucial for daily living needs such as nails, tools, hinges, latches, hooks, cranes, cooking utensils, and parts for wagons, wheels and sleds. Small ironworks sprang up near local waterpower.

In addition to tinware, ammunition was made from the local lead mines during the Revolutionary War. East Berlin Milling Co. produced cotton and woolen yarn which was spun into clothing and blankets. Simeon North, manufacturer of pistols, became the first official pistol maker for the United States Government when he developed a system of interchangeable parts for pistols. In the 1800s, business of all sorts thrived in Berlin. Makers of wagons, tableware, hats, clocks, books, combs, woolen clothes and blankets, cabinet and coffin makers, sleighs, muffs, and suits, were all local industries. Berlin was on the direct route from New Haven to Hartford, with taverns and inns, which were regular stagecoach stops for fresh horses, meals and sleeping accommodations.

Two meetinghouses had been built, one in Kensington Parish, still in use today as the Kensington Congregational Church. The Worthington Meetinghouse was in continuous use as a church, town hall, school and town offices until 1974.

Berlin was proud to have one of the 75 official post offices designated by Benjamin Franklin, first Postmaster General. A historic marker showing that the next post office was in Hartford, 11 miles away, is still located on Worthington Ridge.

By the late 1700s, a village library had been started, and the town boasted of five school districts. In the mid 1800s, the Worthington Academy was built, which ultimately housed 125 students from neighboring states. The Berlin Railroad Depot opened as a way station on the New York, New Haven and Hartford line. Today, this train station is one of the last places in the U.S. that sells tickets to anywhere in the U.S. or Canada.

The mid 1800s brought competition from mass-produced products, forcing the peddlers out of business. It also brought the establishment of the brick making industry locally, which eventually produced 90,000 bricks daily until the 1960s.

Geography
The geographic center of Connecticut is located in Berlin.

The west side of Berlin is flanked by the Metacomet Ridge, a mountainous trap rock ridgeline that stretches from Long Island Sound to nearly the Vermont border. Notable mountains of the Metacomet ridge in Berlin include the Hanging Hills, Lamentation Mountain, Short Mountain, and Ragged Mountain. The  Metacomet Trail and the  Mattabesett Trail traverse the ridge.

Demographics

As of the 2010 census Berlin had a population of 19,866.  The racial makeup of the population was 94.9% white, 0.7% black or African American, 0.1% Native American, 2.7% Asian, 0.6% from some other race and 1.0% from two or more races.  3.2% of the population was Hispanic or Latino of any race.

As of the census of 2000, there were 18,215 people, 6,792 households, and 5,155 families residing in the town. The racial makeup of the town was 97.03% White, 0.36% African American, 0.05% Native American, 1.65% Asian, 0.01% Pacific Islander, 0.18% from other races, and 0.73% from two or more races. Hispanic or Latino of any race were 1.47% of the population.

There were 6,792 households, out of which 34.3% had children under the age of 18 living with them, 65.5% were married couples living together, 7.7% had a female householder with no husband present, and 24.1% were non-families. 20.8% of all households were made up of individuals, and 10.9% had someone living alone who was 65 years of age or older.  The average household size was 2.67 and the average family size was 3.11.

In the town, the population was spread out, with 24.7% under the age of 18, 5.3% from 18 to 24, 27.8% from 25 to 44, 25.6% from 45 to 64, and 16.6% who were 65 years of age or older.  The median age was 41 years. For every 100 females, there were 94.4 males.  For every 100 females age 18 and over, there were 91.7 males.

The median income for a household in the town was $68,068, and the median income for a family was $76,756. Males had a median income of $49,714 versus $34,832 for females. The per capita income for the town was $27,744.  About 1.4% of families and 2.5% of the population were below the poverty line, including 0.9% of those under age 18 and 6.8% of those age 65 or over.

Government and politics

Berlin has historically been a bellwether to the state of Connecticut in presidential elections, although recently it has had a tendency to lean Democratic. Donald J. Trump, however, put the town back into the GOP column in 2016.

Economy

Top employers
According to Berlin's 2018 Comprehensive Annual Financial Report,   the top employers in the city are:

Transportation
Berlin is bisected by a north-south arterial road, U.S. 5 and an expressway, Connecticut State Route 9. Connecticut State Route 372 is a local east-west road serving the town. 

Berlin is located on the New Haven–Springfield Line with daily passenger service to points north and south and to New York City via a connection in New Haven. In the Kensington neighborhood on Berlin's west side is Berlin station by the CT Rail's Hartford Line trains and by Amtrak's Hartford Line, Northeast Regional, and Valley Flyer.

Notable people

 Luann de Lesseps (born 1965), cast member on The Real Housewives of New York City
 Sam McKinniss (born 1985), abstract and figurative postmodern painter; born in Minnesota, raised in Berlin from when he was a one-year-old
 Simeon North (1765–1852), manufacturing pioneer; adopted milling/manufacturing with interchangeable parts
 Ryan Preece (born 1990), NASCAR driver 
 Austin Stowell (born 1984), actor known for films Dolphin Tale, Whiplash, and Bridge of Spies
 Emma Hart Willard (1787–1870), pioneer in women's education

Education

There are three elementary schools, Mary E. Griswold School, Emma Hart Willard School, and Richard D. Hubbard School, as well as Catherine M. McGee Middle School, and Berlin High School. Besides these, there is one private education school in Berlin; Saint Paul School (Founded 1958).

The town's public library is the Berlin-Peck Memorial Library located at the Arthur B. Powers complex, the library contains an adjoining community center with publicly available meeting rooms, a gym area and a game room. Adult education classes are held here as well as meetings for civic and student groups.

Pronunciation

Although taken from the name of the Prussian capital, Berlin, which receives the stress in its pronunciation on the second syllable, the name of the town in Connecticut has always received the stress in its pronunciation on the first syllable, in keeping with the recessive accent usual in the pronunciation of English.  Notwithstanding this history, a contemporary legend claims that the emphasis was changed during the First World War to differentiate the little town from the German city.

References

External links

Town of Berlin official website

 
Towns in Hartford County, Connecticut
Populated places established in 1785
Towns in Connecticut
Greater Hartford